Islam is the faith of the majority of the residents of the island of Mayotte with 97% as Muslims and 3% Christians. 85,000 of the total 90,000 inhabitants of the island are Mahorais. The Mahorais are a blend of settlers from many areas: mainland Africans, Arabs and Malagasy. The presence of Islam in Mayotte can traced back to at least the 15th century.

Although young people wear Western style clothing, traditional clothing is still common among adults. While in town, a Mahorais man will typically wear a white cotton garment and a length shirt, sometimes with a white jacket and white skull cap. Out of town, a long cloth sarong (colorful skirt) is worn. Most women wear traditionnel coloured salouva or occidental outfit.

Polygamy has been an acceptable practice among the Mahorais. However, on March 29, 2009, 95% of Mayotte citizens voted to become the 101st department of France. Due to the vote becoming effective in March 2011, the island is required to bar all forms of polygamous unions and other forms of practices that "contradict with French culture", including child marriages. At the present time, polygamous marriages are presumed to have been stopped being issued by the government.

The practice of Islam in Mayotte has been described as tolerant.

Mosques
 Tsingoni Mosque

See also
 Islam in France

References